Jacksonville is an unincorporated community in Towns County, in the U.S. state of Georgia.

History
It is unclear why the name Jacksonville was applied to this community.

References

Unincorporated communities in Towns County, Georgia